Naranja is an unincorporated community and census-designated place (CDP) in Miami-Dade County, Florida, United States.  Many orange groves were once located in this area, so the community name came from the Spanish word for orange, naranja, though the pronunciation among the local residents is "Na-Ran-Jah". Naranja was also a stop for the Florida East Coast Railroad that once ran through this area. The population was 13,509 at the 2020 census, up from 8,303 in 2010.

Geography

U.S. Route 1 (Dixie Highway) runs along the northwest edge of the community. The Homestead Extension of Florida's Turnpike touches the southeast corner of the community, with partial access from Exit 6 (Tallahassee Road) and full access from Exit 5 (Biscayne Drive) in Leisure City.

Demographics

2020 census

Note: the US Census treats Hispanic/Latino as an ethnic category. This table excludes Latinos from the racial categories and assigns them to a separate category. Hispanics/Latinos can be of any race.

As of the census of 2000, there were 4,034 people, 1,196 households, and 875 families residing in the CDP. The racial makeup of the CDP was 32.99% White (of which 12.7% were Non-Hispanic Whites,) 57.54% African American, 0.42% Native American, 1.39% Asian, 0.15% Pacific Islander, 3.89% from other races, and 3.62% from two or more races. Hispanic or Latino of any race were 26.97% of the population.

There were 1,196 households, out of which 48.7% had children under the age of 18 living with them, 30.4% were married couples living together, 36.0% had a female householder with no husband present, and 26.8% were non-families. 20.6% of all households were made up of individuals, and 5.9% had someone living alone who was 65 years of age or older.  The average household size was 3.23 and the average family size was 3.73.

In the CDP, the population was spread out, with 39.5% under the age of 18, 11.3% from 18 to 24, 27.8% from 25 to 44, 14.0% from 45 to 64, and 7.4% who were 65 years of age or older.  The median age was 24 years. For every 100 females, there were 90.6 males.  For every 100 females age 18 and over, there were 82.7 males.

The median income for a household in the CDP was $18,825, and the median income for a family was $19,443. Males had a median income of $22,614 versus $19,167 for females. The per capita income for the CDP was $7,346.  About 42.3% of families and 50.5% of the population were below the poverty line, including 62.7% of those under age 18 and 19.8% of those age 65 or over.

As of 2000, speakers of English as a first language accounted for 66.25% of residents, while Spanish made up 28.14%, French Creole was at 4.64%, and Tagalog was the mother tongue of 0.95% of the population.

Education
Miami-Dade County Public Schools operates area public schools.

Dr. William A. Chapman Elementary School, which opened in 1976, serves the Naranja community, and is located in the CDP. Also serving the Naranja community is, Coconut Palm K-8 Academy, which replaced the former Naranja Elementary School.  This school is located approximately 3 miles from the former Naranja Elementary School. 

Young Men's Academy for Academic and Civic Development (YMAACD) at Miami Douglas MacArthur Senior High School South (MacArthur South), an alternative school, was scheduled to move to the Naranja area for the 2009-2010 school year, in the location of the former Naranja Elementary School. The name has since been changed to Miami Macarthur Educational Center. 

Miami MacArthur South Senior High School is also in the CDP. This is a public, alternative school located in Naranja, Florida. It has approximately 107 students in grades 6-12 with a teacher student ratio of 5-1. According to state test scores, at least 10% of the students are proficient in math and 10% in reading.

Notable people
Jamal Carter (born 1994), American football player

See also
Naranja-Princeton, Florida, a single census area recorded during the 1980 Census

References

Census-designated places in Miami-Dade County, Florida
Census-designated places in Florida